Michail Savitskiy (born 1 July 2003) is a German ice dancer. With his skating partner, Darya Grimm, he is the 2022 JGP Latvia champion, the two-time German junior national champion (2022, 2023), and placed in the top five at the 2022 World Junior Figure Skating Championships.

Personal life 
Savitskiy was born on 1 July 2003 in Offenbach am Main, Germany.

Career

Early career 
Savitskiy competed initially in men's singles figure skating. However, by the end of the 2018–19 season, he found himself losing interest in the discipline, later saying "jump-wise I was doing okay, but lost the interest in single skating. I basically wanted to retire, but then I had the opportunity to switch to ice dance and I thought, 'why shouldn’t I try it?'"

In September of 2019, Savitskiy formed an ice dance partnership with Darya Grimm. They began training in Oberstdorf, coached by former Soviet ice dancers Rostislav Sinicyn and Natalia Karamysheva.

2021–22 season
With the onset of COVID-19 pandemic having cancelled international junior competitions in the 2020–21 season, Grimm/Savitskiy had the opportunity to make their ISU Junior Grand Prix debut in the fall of 2021. Given two assignments, they placed sixth at both the 2021 JGP France in Courchevel and the 2021 JGP Austria in Linz. They went on to place fourth at both the Ice Challenge and the Egna Dance Trophy, and won the German junior national title.

Their national title earned Grimm/Savitskiy the German berth at the 2022 World Junior Championships. The championships could not be held as scheduled in Sofia in early March, and as a result were rescheduled for Tallinn in mid-April. The championships were further upended when Vladimir Putin ordered a Russian invasion of Ukraine. As a result of the invasion, the International Skating Union banned all Russian and Belarusian athletes from participating in competitions, which had a significant impact on the junior dance field. In the leadup, Grimm briefly tested positive for COVID, but only lost a few training days. Competing in Tallinn, Grimm/Savitskiy placed an unexpected fourth in the rhythm dance. Seventh in the free dance, they were fifth overall. Reflecting on their result, Savitskiy noted "I don't think many people expected that and it was a surprise for us as well, but of course we are very happy."

2022–23 season
Beginning the Junior Grand Prix at the 2022 JGP Latvia in Riga, Grimm/Savitskiy were the pre-event favourites in light of their Junior World result, but were narrowly second in the rhythm dance. They decisively overtook Canadians Gauthier/Thieren in the free dance, taking the gold medal. This was their first international win, and the first Junior Grand Prix gold for a German dance team since 2002. At their second event in Gdańsk, they took the silver medal behind reigning World bronze medalists Bashynska/Beaumont, despite Grimm falling in the free dance. Their results qualified them for the Junior Grand Prix Final. They finished fifth in both segments and overall at the Final.

After winning their second German junior title, Grimm/Savitskiy won the gold medal at the Bavarian Open's junior event. Both dealt with illness in the leadup to the 2023 World Junior Championships in Calgary. They finished narrowly sixth in the rhythm dance with a new personal best score of 65.67, 0.14 behind the fifth-place French team Fradji/Fourneaux. However, they had to withdraw before the free dance, citing Grimm having come down with suspected food poisoning. She said that they were "really upset, but we don't want to risk our health," and so "with an amazing rhythm dance and a sixth-place, we are finishing our season."

Programs

With Grimm

Competitive highlights 
JGP: Junior Grand Prix

With Grimm

References

External links 
 

2003 births
Living people
German male ice dancers
Sportspeople from Offenbach am Main